Harold "Butch" Booker, also known as Hal Booker (born July 20, 1945) is a retired American basketball player.

He played collegiately for the Cheyney University of Pennsylvania. He was drafted by both the New York Knicks (5th round) and the Seattle SuperSonics (4th round) in the 1968 and 1969 editions of the NBA draft, respectively, but never played for either team.

He played for the Miami Floridians (1969–70) in the ABA for 12 games.

External links

1945 births
Living people
American men's basketball players
Centers (basketball)
Cheyney Wolves men's basketball players
Miami Floridians players
New York Knicks draft picks
Parade High School All-Americans (boys' basketball)
Seattle SuperSonics draft picks